Suczki  is a village in the administrative district of Gmina Ełk, within Ełk County, Warmian-Masurian Voivodeship, in north-eastern Poland. It is located on the western shore of Lake Bajtkowskie in the region of Masuria.

The village has an approximate population of 75.

The village was founded by Poles in 1484 or earlier.

References

Populated lakeshore places in Poland
Villages in Ełk County